The  Island Belle  is a vessel built in 1916 at Smith Island, Maryland. From 1916 until 1977 this vessel provided the only regular transportation between Smith Island, the state's only "water-locked" settlement, and the mainland.

She was listed on the National Register of Historic Places in 1979.

References

External links
, including undated photo, at Maryland Historical Trust

Transportation in Somerset County, Maryland
1916 ships
Ships on the National Register of Historic Places in Maryland
Smith Island, Maryland
National Register of Historic Places in Somerset County, Maryland